Libertad Gran Mamoré Fútbol Club, sometimes known as just Gran Mamoré, is a Bolivian football club based in Trinidad, Beni. Founded in 2008, they play in the Copa Simón Bolívar, holding home matches at the Estadio Gran Mamoré, with a capacity of 15,000 people.

History
Founded in 2008 by two Christian brothers who intended to create a Christian football team, the club was named Fútbol Club Libertad, and reached the first division of the Beni Football Association in 2009. In 2018, the club won their first regional championship, qualifying to the Copa Simón Bolívar.

In 2020, Libertad was renamed to Libertad Gran Mamoré Fútbol Club, with the intention of rescue the memories of the dissolved Real Mamoré. In November 2022, the club first reached the final of the Simón Bolívar. Despite losing the final to Vaca Díez, they achieved a first-ever promotion to the Primera División after defeating Universitario de Sucre in the promotion/relegation play-offs.

Managers
 Cristian Reynaldo (2020)
 Carlos Leeb (2021)
 Cleibson Ferreira (2022)
 Cristian Reynaldo (2022–)

References

External links
Soccerway team profile

Football clubs in Bolivia
Association football clubs established in 2008
2008 establishments in Bolivia